The Protocol on Visits to Religious Shrines 1974 is a bilateral agreement between India and Pakistan facilitating Indian and Pakistani nationals to visit certain religious shrines in both countries. As of November 2018, fifteen locations in Pakistan and five in India are covered under this protocol.

List of locations 
These are a list of locations covered by the protocol:

In India 

 Ajmer Sharif Dargah, dedicated to sufi saint Moinuddin Chishti in Ajmer, Rajasthan
 Nizamuddin Dargah, dedicated to sufi saint Nizamuddin Auliya, in Delhi
 Amir Khusro, dedicated to Sufi musician Amir Khusro in Delhi
 Sirhind Sharif, Mujaddid Alf Sani in Sirhind, Punjab, India
 Kalyar Sharif, dedicated to sufi saint Alauddin Ali Ahmed Sabir, near Haridwar

In Pakistan 

 Shadani Darbar in Hyat Pitafi, Ghotki
 Katasraj Dham in Lahore
 Gurudwaras of Nankana Sahib
 Gurudwara Panja Sahib, Hasan Abdal
 Samadhi of  Ranjit Singh, Lahore
 Gurudwara Dera Sahib, Lahore
 Gurudwara Janam Asthan, Nankana Sahib
 Gurudwara Deewan Khana, Lahore
 Gurudwara Shaheed Ganj, Singhanian, Lahore
 Gurudwara Bhai Tara Singh, Lahore
 Gurudwara of Sixth Guru, Mozang, Lahore
 Birthplace of Guru Ram Das, Lahore
 Gurudwara Cheveen Padshahi, Mozang, Lahore
 Shrine of Data Ganj Bakhsh, Lahore
 Mirpur Mathelo, Sindh

References 
India–Pakistan relations
India–Pakistan treaties
1974 in Pakistan
1974 in India
Religion in Pakistan
Religion in India